"I Could Use a Love Song" is a song co-written and recorded by American country music singer Maren Morris for her debut studio album, Hero (2016). Morris wrote the song with Jimmy Robbins and Laura Veltz, and co-produced the track with busbee. It was released to North American country radio on March 27, 2017 through Columbia Nashville as the album's third single. A song about heartbreak and finding redemption through love, it garnered positive reviews from critics. "I Could Use a Love Song" reached number one on the Billboard Country Airplay chart, giving Morris her second number-one single, and her first as a solo artist. It also peaked at numbers seven and 56 on both the Hot Country Songs and Hot 100 charts respectively. The song was certified Platinum, and has sold 206,000 copies as of December 2017. It achieved similar chart success in Canada, reaching number 14 on the Country chart and garnering a Platinum certification from Music Canada, denoting sales of over 80,000 units in that country.

Content
"I Could Use a Love Song" is a "no frills heartbreak song" that finds the narrator becoming jaded towards love. Despite having been burned by previous relationships, Morris remains optimistic and believes that a love song can restore her faith in finding love.

Background and release
"I Could Use a Love Song" was announced as the album's third single on February 24, 2017. The song was made available to country radio on March 13, but did not officially impact the format until March 27, 2017.

Critical reception
Mike Wass of Idolator expressed surprise over the choice of single, but wrote that the song "harks back to a time in country music when songs examined matters of the heart over simple arrangements," which works in the track's favor. Billy Dukes of Taste of Country reviewed the song favorably. He wrote that "I Could Use a Love Song" is "more immediately accessible than her previous two radio hits," and praised Morris for expressing a new side to her artistry.

Music video
The music video of the song was released on May 6, 2017, and starred Shelley Hennig and Garrett Hines as the couple.

Accolades

Commercial performance
"I Could Use a Love Song" debuted at number 56 on the Billboard Country Airplay chart dated April 1, 2017 and was the week's highest-debuting single. On the week dated September 2, the song debuted at number 97 on the Billboard Hot 100 before dropping to number 100 the week of September 9, and left the week after. The track reappeared on the chart dated September 23 at number 92 and reached number 56 the week of January 20, 2018 before leaving the chart completely, remaining there for twenty-one weeks. It has sold 206,000 copies in the United States as of December 2017. It peaked at number one on the Country Airplay chart dated January 20, giving Morris her second number one single and her first as a solo artist.

Charts and certifications

Weekly charts

Year-end charts

Certifications

Release history

References

2016 songs
2017 singles
Maren Morris songs
Columbia Nashville Records singles
Song recordings produced by busbee
Songs written by Jimmy Robbins
Songs written by Laura Veltz
Songs written by Maren Morris